Numatik Swing Band is a live album by Roswell Rudd and the Jazz Composer's Orchestra released on the JCOA label in 1973.

Reception

The AllMusic review by Scott Yanow awarded the album 4 stars stating "The music on this date is avant-garde, but has its melodic and accessible sections".  

The authors of The Harmony Illustrated Encyclopedia of Jazz wrote that the album "shows [Rudd's] concern for textures, French horns rising over drum beat, piano and basses in unison, the scampering piccolo. Rudd himself plays well but the star of the session is drummer Beaver Harris, tirelessly inventive."

Trombonist and composer Jacob Garchik wrote: "Fascinating writing for a 25 piece large ensemble, another one of his under-explored talents! And consequently another obscure, impossible to find record, his third as a leader. Perhaps in a parallel universe we would be reverentially talking about him as a big band composer."

In an article for One Final Note, David Dupont called the album "Rudd's tribute to the art of wind playing," and noted: "Over four of its five movements, Rudd explores the continuing implications of humanity's discovery that such beautiful noise can be made by blowing into hollow devices." He commented: "The recording showed his more adventurous side... and it featured one of the masterpieces of Rudd's career: The solo on the 'Circulation' movement. As that solo built to its climax, Rudd turned a perfectly formed lyrical gem—so perfect, I always assumed it was part of the composition."

Track listing
All compositions by Roswell Rudd
 "Vent" - 4:50  
 "Breathahoward" - 2:52  
 "Circulation" - 10:15  
 "Lullaby For Greg" (lyrics by Rudd, Barry Galbraith, & Sheila Jordan) - 11:10  
 "Aerosphere" - 14:15 
Recorded at New York University's Loeb Student Center on July 6, 1973.

Personnel
Roswell Rudd - trombone, french horn, producer
Enrico Rava, Michael Krasnov, Mike Lawrence, Charles Sullivan - trumpet
Janet Donaruma, Jeffrey Schlegel, Sharon Freeman - French horn
Art Baron, Gary Brooks - trombone 
Perry Robinson - clarinet
Dewey Redman - clarinet, tenor saxophone 
Martin Alter - flute, oboe, alto saxophone  
Carlos Ward - flute, alto saxophone 
Mike Bresler - piccolo, flute, soprano saxophone
Charles Davis - soprano saxophone, baritone saxophone 
Howard Johnson, Bob Stewart - tuba 
Hod O'Brien - piano 
Charlie Haden, Sirone - bass 
Lou Grassi (track 4), Beaver Harris - drums  
Sue Evans, Dan Johnson (track 5) - percussion
Sheila Jordan - vocals

References 

1973 live albums
JCOA Records albums
Roswell Rudd live albums
Jazz Composer's Orchestra albums